The Goodbye Family are a fictional family of undertakers created by fantasy Western author and illustrator Lorin Morgan-Richards. The Goodbye Family comprises Pyridine Goodbye, matriarch and mortician, Otis, father and driver of the hearse, their child Orphie, who has the dual role of gravedigger and self-appointed town Sheriff, and their pets: Ouiji the cat, a tarantula named Dorian, and Midnight their horse.

Since 2009, the Goodbyes have appeared in both single panel comic and literature as part of the Great Mountain book series by Richards that begin with Me’ma and the Great Mountain. The humor of the Goodbye Family is typically gothic or macabre, and often satirizing industrialization and rules of authority. In 2021, The Goodbye Family: The Animated Series made its debut on YouTube, and subsequently followed with streaming services. New York Magazine listed it in the top ten of animated TV series in 2022.

Characters and story
Beginning in 2009, Richards started to produce the Goodbye Family as one-off cards after an inspiring trip to France and Wales. Richards envisioned Orphie, the daughter, and primary character, on the roof of the Notre Dame Cathedral sitting with gargoyles, while her parents Otis tried to board a train with a shrunken head, and Pyridine publicly sewed a cadaver in Cardiff. Subsequent single panel comics and merchandise were made of each character but before delving further into their identities. In 2012, A Raven Above Press released Richards first novel Me’ma and the Great Mountain, about an indigenous girl that overcomes ghoulish spirits to save her people. Along with her journey, she meets Hollis Sorrow, a friendly character entombed in a casket made by the Goodbye Family, marking the first mention in literature of the Goodbye Family. By 2015, Steamkat, an online comic distributor, weekly featured The Goodbye Family comic, and starting in the following year, Richards released subsequent book collections about the family and syndicated his series through social media and Tapas.

The Goodbye family lives in a giant tree that has been made habitable by Otis' woodworking. Their original house was lost in a fire due to the war of the Tried and Boorish.
 Orphie: Daughter who loves mischief and has the strength of 20 men – which comes in handy when carrying caskets and as a gravedigger. She finds herself most often filling in as sheriff of the town and training her pet spider Dorian.
 Otis: Driver of their funeral hearse with an uncanny ability to smell demise a mile away. He is in charge of all the wakes. He spends his free time walking his hat and feeding their horse Midnight various pickled things. 
 Pyridine: Matriarch and mortician of the family. She enjoys needling cadavers and social gatherings with the undead. 
 Ouiji: the family cat. Believed to be part Siamese due to her glowing red eyes.
 Dorian: Orphie's pet tarantula (specifically a Needlepoint Tarantula) that loves to spin webbed accessories for the family. 
 Midnight: Most likely a Friesian horse, she is the Goodbye's main implement of travel for both single rider and carriage. She characteristically is fueled by pickled things.
 Kepla: a mysterious sibling of Orphie that happens to be somehow older than her parents. 
 Lassie: a deadly snake that was introduced in the 2019 comics that assists Orphie like a lasso in catching villains.

In an interview, when asked about the characters influences Richards replied: "I suppose Pyridine Goodbye, the matriarch, is loosely based on my wife, Otis Goodbye is myself, and Orphie their child is Berlin (Richards daughter) and our friend's child Heidi (who came before our daughter). All though with a few other influences. Just like the Goodbye Family we do have a pet tarantula and Siamese cat."

Humor
Richards clarifies the genre of The Goodbye Family: "I fall into the category of Weird West, but I think it may be more of a 'Down West' as I'd like to call it, for its sense of macabre western humor".

The Goodbye Family and the Great Mountain 

The Goodbye Family and the Great Mountain is a gothic Western juvenile fiction novel by Lorin Morgan-Richards, the second in his Great Mountain series, about undertakers Otis, Pyridine, and their daughter Orphie. According to the book's summary Pyridine is a witch and mortician, Otis is a bumbling but brazen hearse driver, and Orphie has the strength of twenty men and helps with grave digging.

Following the first novel Me’ma and the Great Mountain, Me’ma, an Indigenous child, has routed the mining tycoon Baron Von Nickle and headed west over the Great Mountain as the defeated and leaderless miners returned east to the town of Nicklesworth. Frank Thorne is the only soldier to stay intact and searches for the Baron's accomplice. The Goodbye family, undertakers in town, hear of the defeat when the Baron's rattail hair appear on their doorstep. The Goodbye's, suffering from poor business, look to monetize the situation and seek an heir, but find the townsfolk are turning into zombies. Otis finds the culprit in a new tonic that leads the family to Nothom, the underworld, where Thorne is following close behind. They find a production facility that is pumping oil to those above for consumption, dramatically altering the land of Nothom to the dissatisfaction of the Goodbyes. In turn, and without the Baron, the oil is causing the townspeople above, like Thorne, to become the living dead and fall under the control of the Baron's accomplice, a wicked warlock named Zenwick Aldrich. The book is a blend of goth and humor and stylistically has been compared to author's like Roald Dahl.

The story includes a foreword by medium Richard-Lael Lillard.

A common theme in Richards stories is an underlying environmental message. Similarly, to his first novel, Me'ma and the Great Mountain, he also provides a solution. In The Goodbye Family and the Great Mountain, dependence on oil is the cause of conflict and the Goodbye family's disruption and disorder saves the day.

Collections of comics
Memento Mori: The Goodbye Family Album. 2017. 
Wanted: Dead or Alive… But Not Stinkin’. 2017. 
The Goodbye Family Unveiled. 2017. 
Down West. 2018. 
Nicklesworth: Featuring the Goodbye Family. 2018. 
 Gallows Humor: Hangin' with the Goodbye Family (2018) 
 Dead Man's Hand-kerchief: Dealing with the Goodbye Family (2019) 
 The Importance of Being Otis: Undertaking with the Goodbye Family (2019) 
 Yippee Ki-Yayenne Mother Pepper: Getting Saucy with the Goodbye Family (2019) 
 Pyridine's Fancy: It's a Grave Business with the Goodbye Family (2020) 
 Keeping up with the Boneses: Digging with the Goodbye Family (2020) 
 Family Messings: Getting Dirty with the Goodbye Family (2021) 
 It's Your Funeral: Stitched Up with the Goodbye Family (2022)

Comic volumes
 The Goodbye Family Jewels: Volume 1 (2020)

Novels
Me’ma and the Great Mountain. 2012. 
The Goodbye Family and the Great Mountain. 2020.

Television
Initially, Richards released his episodes of The Goodbye Family: The Animated Series in parts on YouTube. On August 19, 2022, Amazon Prime Video picked up the series's first season, as well as Tubi on October 28, 2022. The series has also been added to streaming platforms Apple TV, Xumo, to name a few.

Writers 
Since inception, the series has been written by Lorin Morgan-Richards and editor Jessica Rose Felix.

Voice actors 

The Goodbye Family: The Animated Series has several main cast members: Nick Gligor voices Rusty Potts, Lou Steed, Teddy Helios, Tumbleweed, Cousin Kook, as well as several minor characters. Berlin Richards voices Orphie Goodbye and other children. Nana Grace voices Lee Minor, Madeline Sage, and other female episodic characters. Lorin Morgan-Richards voices Otis Goodbye, Barry Dingle, Reverend Moustache, and other male episodic characters. Valerie Stoneking primarily voices Pyridine Goodbye and female townspeople. Elijah Shaffer voices Rowe Barrow and Mayor Big Jo. 

Recurring guest appearances have included Richard-Lael Lillard, Mather Louth and Chopper Franklin, among others.

Season 1 (2021–22)
<onlyinclude>

Season 2 (2022–23)
<onlyinclude>

Audiobook
In August 2022, an audiobook was released for The Goodbye Family and the Great Mountain, narrated by Richard-Lael Lillard.

Soundtrack
In 2021, Ratchet Blade Records released The Goodbye Family EP, produced and mixed by Chopper Franklin, lyrics by Lorin Morgan-Richards, vocals by Mather Louth and music by the Heathen Apostles. Song list includes Sew it up, Get Outta Dodge, and Lake of Fire (instrumental).

In the second season of The Goodbye Family: The Animated Series, Richards and Franklin collaborated again to create Gothic Western Haunt. A single, produced and mixed by Chopper Franklin, lyrics by Lorin Morgan-Richards, vocals by Mather Louth and music by Heathen Apostles (2023, Ratchet Blade Records).

References

External links
 The Goodbye Family on Tapas

2009 comics debuts
American comics characters
Black comedy comics
Comics about married people
Comics characters introduced in 2009
Environmental fiction books
Fantasy Westerns
Fictional families
Fictional undertakers
Gag cartoon comics
Gag-a-day comics
Humor comics
Mass media franchises introduced in 2009
Metafictional comics
Satirical comics
Surreal comedy
Tapastic webcomics
Webtoons
Western (genre) comics
Western (genre) comics characters
2020s American animated comedy television series
2020s American adult animated television series
2020s American sitcoms
2022 American television series debuts
American animated sitcoms
American adult animated comedy television series
American flash adult animated television series
Animated television series about families
English-language television shows